The Medici lions are a pair of marble sculptures of lions: one of which is Roman, dating to the 2nd century AD, and the other a 16th-century pendant. Both were by 1598 placed at the Villa Medici, Rome.  Since 1789 they have been displayed at the Loggia dei Lanzi in Florence. The sculptures depict standing male lions with a sphere or ball under one paw, looking to the side.

Copies of the Medici lions have been made and publicly installed in over 30 other locations, and smaller versions made in a variety of media; Medici lion has become the term for the type.

A similar Roman lion sculpture, of the 1st century AD, is known as the Albani lion, and is now in the Louvre.  Here, the stone used for the ball is different from the basalt body. Both may derive from a Hellenistic original.

History 
A pair of lions were required by Ferdinando I de' Medici, Grand Duke of Tuscany, who had acquired the Villa Medici in 1576, to serve as majestic ornaments for the villa's garden staircase, the Loggia dei leoni. The first lion originates from a 2nd-century marble that was first mentioned in 1594, by the sculptor Flaminio Vacca, by which time it was already in the collection of Ferdinando; Vacca reported that it had been found in the via Prenestina, outside Porta San Lorenzo. According to Vacca, the lion had been a relief, which was carved free of its background and reworked by "Giovanni Sciarano" or Giovanni di Scherano Fancelli, of whom little is now known.

The second was made and signed by Vacca, also in marble, as a pendant to the ancient sculpture at a date variously reported as between 1594 and 1598 or between 1570 and 1590. The pair were in place at the Loggia dei Leoni in 1598 The pendant was made from a capital that had come from the Temple of Jupiter Optimus Maximus.

The Villa Medici was inherited by the house of Lorraine in 1737, and in 1787 the lions were moved to Florence, and since 1789 they flank the steps to the Loggia dei Lanzi at the Piazza della Signoria.

The sculptures were replaced by copies at the Villa Medici when Napoleon relocated the French Academy in Rome to the villa in 1803. These copies were made by the French sculptor Augustin Pajou.

Copies 

The original Medici lions (1598) have since 1789 stood in the Loggia dei Lanzi, Piazza della Signoria, Florence. There is a smaller bronze left-looking sculpture attributed to Italian sculptor Pietro da Barga and the same period. Later copies or replicas include (ordered by first year):

Spain 
 Twelve sculptures in bronze by Matteo Bonucelli da Lucca, commissioned in Rome by Velázquez for the Room of Mirrors at the Royal Alcazar of Madrid (1651):
 Eight sculptures are now in the Museo del Prado, of which four support the tabletop of Rodrigo Calderón.

Sweden 
 Sculpture in bronze in the Royal Swedish Academy of Arts building, Stockholm (before 1735?).
 Sculpture in bronze at the Royal Institute of Art, Stockholm (1995).
 Sculpture in bronze in Nacka, Stockholm (1996).

Britain 
 Sculptures in lead at Stowe House attributed to John Cheere (around 1755–779). Formerly placed at Stanley Park, Blackpool (1927–2013).
 Sculpture in the park of Kedleston Hall, carved by Joseph Wilton (around 1760–70).
 Two artificial stone versions are found in the garden of Osborne House (1845–1851), Isle of Wight.
 Sculptures at the Stanley Park, Blackpool (2013). These were produced, by Rupert Harris Conservation, using casts from the former sculptures which were returned, on loan, to Stowe house in 2013.

Russia and Ukraine 
Versions in Saint Petersburg, Russia include:

 The  in bronze at Peterhof Palace (1799–1801).
 Sculptures in marble at the Lobanov-Rostovsky Residence (constructed 1817–20).
 Sculptures in bronze at the staircase of the Mikhailovsky Palace (constructed 1819–25).
 Sculptures at the entrance of Yelagin Palace (completed 1822).
 The Lions at the Dvortsovaya pier in bronze at the Admiralty embankment (1832).
 Sculptures at the pier on the western point of Yelagin Island (1926).

Versions in southern Russia and later Ukraine include:

 Sculptures in marble at the Vorontsov Palace, Odessa (now Ukraine, completed 1830).
 One pair of marble lion sculptures at the Voronstov Palace, Crimea (installed in 1848).
 Pair of lion sculptures at Starosinnyi Garden, Odessa (now Ukraine, unknown year).
 Lion sculpture at the National University of Life and Environmental Sciences of Ukraine Botanical Garden.

Italy 
 Sculptures in marble by Augustin Pajou at the Villa Medici (1803).

Germany 
 Four miniature versions surrounding the Akademie- or Löwenbrunnen in the palace garden (1807–1811), Stuttgart.
 Two gilded versions as part of the Lion Fountain in front of Glienicke Palace (1824–26), Berlin.
 Statues at the entrance of Schloss Monrepos, Ludwigsburg (of unknown origin).

Cuba 
 Two versions outside the Cathedral de la Purisma Concepción in Cienfuegos (built 1833–69), Cuba.

United States 

 The Florentine Lions in cast-iron in the Fairmount Park, Philadelphia (cast in 1849 at the Alexandroffsky Head Mechanical Works, St Petersburg, Russia for Andrew M. Eastwick, originally displayed at Bartram's Garden, 1851–1879, installed at west Fairmount Park in 1887).
 Medici Lions, at Bowdoin College Museum of Art, Bowdoin College, Maine. The Museum’s landmark Walker Art Building was commissioned for the College by Harriet and Sophia Walker in honor of their uncle, a Boston businessman who had supported the creation of the first small art gallery at Bowdoin in the mid-nineteenth century. Designed by Charles Follen McKim of McKim, Mead, & White, the building was completed in 1894 and is on the National Register of Historic Places.
 Stone sculptures, Mick and Mack, at McMicken Hall, The University of Cincinnati, Ohio (there since 1904). The pair of lions originally belonged to Jacob Hoffner, a wealthy Cincinnati landowner who bequeathed them to the University upon his death in 1891. They were transported to their current location in 1904.
 The pair of lions on the western end of the eponymous Bridge of Lions in St. Augustine, Florida (constructed 1925–1927, rebuilt 2011–2012).
 Sculpture in limestone at the Museum of Outdoor Arts, Colorado (founded 1981).

Estonia 
 The Swedish lion in bronze in Narva, Estonia. A version of one of the Slottslejonen was first erected in 1936 but destroyed 1944 during the German occupation. A sized-down copy of the Medici Lion in the Royal Swedish Academy of Arts was re-erected in 2000.

Lithuania 
 Sculptures of lions are in bronze at the staircase of the Vytautas the Great War Museum in Kaunas, Lithuania. They were donated by Lithuanian count Jonas Jurgis Tiškevičius (1917–1987) in 1938 from his Astravas Manor in Biržai suburb (decorative sculptures of lions that stood at the entrance to the manor were replaced with copies). Sculptures was made in Saint Petersburg's factory commissioned by Lithuanian count Jonas Tiškevčius in the middle of the 19th century.

France 
 Several sculptures at the Terrasse des Orangers in Parc de Saint-Cloud, Hauts-de-Seine, Paris (of unknown origin).

Hungary 
 Statues at Pétervására, Hungary (of unknown origin).

Close imitations 

 Sweden:  (Swedish for The Palace Lions) in bronze, by Bernard Foucquet at the Royal Palace, Stockholm (1700–1704).
 United Kingdom: Sculptures in bronze at the Queen's Gate entrance to Royal Victoria Park in Bath (1818–1819).
 Belgium: Lion of Waterloo in iron, by Jean-François Van Geel in Waterloo (1826).
 India: Fitzgerald Bridge statue in Pune, India (1866).
 Spain: The  in bronze at the Congress of Deputies, Madrid, Cast in 1865, installed 1872.
 Finland: Parolan Leijona (Finnish for The Lion of Parola) on a  pedestal in Hattula. Erected in 1868 to commemorate the 1863 visit by Alexander II of Russia.
 Barbados: The Lion at Gun Hill carved from a single piece of coral stone in 1868 by Captain Henry John Wilkinson, who was stationed there. It is situated southeast and below the Gun Hill Signal Station, over-looking the St. George Valley.

In popular culture 
Downsized copies of the Medici lions are on display in the garden of the Corleone family estate in The Godfather (1972).

See also 
 Marzocco (the heraldic symbol of Florence)
 The Albani lion (the 1st century Roman lion with a sphere)
 Cultural depictions of lions
 Chinese guardian lions

Notes

References 
 Flaminio Vacca, di varie antichità trovate in diversi luoghi della città di Roma, not published until 1790 (noted by Francis Haskell and Nicholas Penny, Taste and the Antique: the lure of classical sculpture, 1500–1900 1981).
 Michel Hochmann: Villa Medici, il sogno di un Cardinale – Collezioni e artisti di Ferdinando de' Medici, De Luca, 1999, p. 208–11, nos. 37–40, illus. pp. 209–11
 Roberto Manescalchi Il Marzocco / The lion of Florence. In collaborazione con Maria Carchio, Alessandro del Meglio, English summary by Gianna Crescioli. Grafica European Center of Fine Arts e Assessorato allo sport e tempo libero, Valorizzazioni tradizioni fiorentine, Toponomastica, Relazioni internazionale e gemellaggi del comune di Firenze, novembre, 2005.

External links 
 
 3D model of a Medici lion

Outdoor sculptures in Florence
Sculptures of lions
16th-century sculptures
Marble sculptures in Italy
Archaeological discoveries in Italy
Renaissance sculptures